Dieteria bigelovii, also known as Bigelow's tansyaster or sticky aster, is a North American species of plants in the family Asteraceae.

Description 
The blue or purple ray florets are female, while the yellow disc florets are bisexual. The ray florets close upwards in shade. The fruit is seedlike, with bristles at the tip.

True asters are similar, but usually lack spiny or divided leaves.

Taxonomy 
Varieties
 Dieteria bigelovii var. bigelovii - Colorado, New Mexico, Wyoming 
 Dieteria bigelovii var. commixta (Greene) D.R.Morgan & R.L.Hartm. - Wasatch Mountains in Utah
 Dieteria bigelovii var. mucronata (Greene) D.R.Morgan & R.L.Hartm. - Kaibab Plateau in northern Arizona

Distribution and habitat
The species is native to the southwestern United States (Arizona, New Mexico, Utah, Colorado, and Albany County in Wyoming). It can be found in open areas of coniferous forests.

References

Astereae
Flora of the Western United States
Plants described in 1857
Flora without expected TNC conservation status